Tommaso Gherardini (December 21, 1715 - 1797) was an Italian painter, mainly of Rococo fresco decorations.

Biography
He was born in Florence, where he was a pupil of Vincenzo Meucci. He also traveled to Bologna and Venice to study at the respective academies. He painted a hall of the Gallery of the Uffizi and also in the Imperial palace of Vienna

References

1715 births
1797 deaths
18th-century Italian painters
Italian male painters
Painters from Florence
Italian Baroque painters
18th-century Italian male artists